Judy Garland at Home at the Palace: Opening Night is a concert album by Judy Garland, released in 1967 through ABC Records. The album peaked at number 174 on the Billboard 200.

In the LP liner notes, George Hoefer, who was associate editor of the magazine Jazz & Pop, observed,
Miss Garland calls the Palace 'home'. Her love affair with the 1,700-seated house began back in the fall of 1951 when she went in for a four-week stay and remained 19 weeks. ... This record takes its listeners right into the packed house and captures not only Miss Garland's great performance, but the 'electricity' in the air, and the sounds from the audience as well. Rarely, if ever, has a performer received such a resounding ovation within the confines of a theater – at the closing of the opening night show the standing applause lasted for 25 minutes.

The singer enters the theater from the front or lobby-end of the house. As she skips down the aisle to the accompaniment of an overture made up of some of her best-known songs, her fans begin an applause policy that is reactivated between each of her subsequent songs. ...

She works with a hand microphone, a device that permits her to range the stage from one end to the other. Her performance is interspersed with a wondrous sense of showmanship evidenced by calculated pauses, kiss-throwing, short imitation dance steps, and hand gestures. Between the tunes, she answers all questions and acknowledges the protestations of love from the enthusiastic friends out front. ...

The listener will note that the show is enhanced and given a very human touch when the singer brings out her daughter Lorna and her son Joey to join her in three numbers.

Track listing
A-Side
 Overture (Medley of "The Trolley Song" (by Hugh Martin and Ralph Blane); "Over the Rainbow" (music by Harold Arlen and lyrics by E.Y. Harburg); "The Man That Got Away" (music by Harold Arlen and lyrics by Ira Gershwin) 4:04
 "I Feel a Song Coming On" (music by Jimmy McHugh and lyrics by Dorothy Fields and George Oppenheimer) 1:43
 "Almost Like Being in Love" (music by Frederick Loewe and lyrics by Alan Jay Lerner); "This Can't Be Love" (music by Richard Rodgers and lyrics by Lorenz Hart) 3:09
 Medley: "You Made Me Love You (I Didn't Want to Do It)" (music by James V. Monaco and lyrics by Joseph McCarthy); "For Me and My Gal" (by George W. Meyer, Edgar Leslie; E. Ray Goetz), and "The Trolley Song" 3:21
 "What Now, My Love" (music by Gilbert Bécaud and original lyrics by Pierre Delanoë; English lyrics and title by Carl Sigman) 3:16
B-Side
 "Bob White (Whatcha Gonna Swing Tonight?)" with daughter Lorna Luft (music by Bernard Hanighen and lyrics by Johnny Mercer); "Jamboree Jones" with Lorna (music by Johnny Mercer); "Together (Wherever We Go)" with Lorna and son Joey Luft (music by Jule Styne and lyrics by Stephen Sondheim); "Over the Rainbow" 5:35
 "Ol' Man River" (music by Jerome Kern and lyrics by Oscar Hammerstein II); "That's Entertainment!" (music by Arthur Schwartz and lyrics by Howard Dietz) 5:45
 "I Loved Him, But He Didn't Love Me" (music and lyrics by Cole Porter) 1:40
 "Rock-a-Bye Your Baby with a Dixie Melody" (music by Jean Schwartz and lyrics by Sam M. Lewis and Joe Young); "Over the Rainbow" 4:03

References

1967 live albums
1967 compilation albums
Judy Garland live albums
ABC Records live albums